William Fitzgibbon (23 May 1878 – 20 May 1955) was an Irish hurler who played as a forward with the Cork senior hurling team. He was an All-Ireland Championship winner in 1902.

Career

Fitzgibbon began his hurling career at club level with Carrigtwohill in East Cork. He enjoyed a lengthy career with the club, however, he never won a Cork Senior Championship title.

At inter-county level, Fitzgibbon first played for the Cork senior hurling team on 3 November 1901 in what was the delayed 1900 championship. Two years later he won an All-Ireland Championship medal after a 3-13 to no score defeat of London at the Cork Athletic Grounds.

Fitzgibbon died at St. Finbarr's Hospital on 20 May 1955.

Honours

Cork
All-Ireland Senior Hurling Championship (1): 1902

References

1878 births
1955 deaths
Carrigtwohill hurlers
Redmond's hurlers
Cork inter-county hurlers
All-Ireland Senior Hurling Championship winners